The Andrés Bonifacio Monument, commonly known simply as Bonifacio Monument or Monumento, is a memorial monument in Caloocan, Philippines which was designed by National Artist Guillermo Tolentino to commemorate the Philippine revolutionary Andrés Bonifacio, the founder and Supremo of the Katipunan, who fought for independence from the politically and socially ruthless colonial rule by Spain. 

The monument  in height with symbolic images and other features known as the "Cry of Balintawak" is acclaimed as one of the best monuments in the world.

Location
The monument is located in South Caloocan at a roundabout crossing of four roads, namely Epifanio de los Santos Avenue (EDSA), the MacArthur Highway, the Samson Road, and Rizal Avenue Extension (Avenida Rizal), the old road leading to Manila.

History

The Bonifacio Monument recalls the Philippine Revolution which was spearheaded  by Andrés Bonifacio who had urged his men to raise against the colonial rule of Spain. His call to take arms against the Spanish rule was given on 23 August 1896, which is widely known as "Cry of Pugad Lawin."

The cornerstone was formally laid by Aurora Quezon, the wife of Filipino Senate President and later President Manuel L. Quezon. The monument, which was created under the orders of American Governor-General Frank Murphy, was inaugurated on 23 October 1933. It was inaugurated by the Speaker of the House, with much fanfare in a colourful function led by three women from Luzon (of the Women's College), Visayas (of the Institute of Women), and Mindanao (of the Centro Escolar de Señoritas/Center for Women) with other women representing the eight provinces of Manila, Cavite, Batangas, Bulacan, Pampanga, Tarlac, Nueva Ecija, and Laguna which had participated in the revolution of 1896.

It is considered the most symbolic of all the monuments in the country, even grander than Motto Stella.

On November 30, 2013, the sesquicentennial of Bonifacio's birth and the 80th anniversary of the monument's unveiling was celebrated.

Features
It is crowned by a figure with wings representing triumph. Below the vertical pylon 20 figures cast in bronze have been molded over an octagonal shaped plinth, plus one angel of peace at the top. The octagon represents the eight provinces who fought against Spain and also represents eight rays of the Katipunan flag. The plinth is raised in three steps, each step representing the three centuries of Spanish rule. These figures are a representation of the people of Philippines, who faced inequality, agony and suppression under the colonial rule which eventually ended in an armed revolution in 1896. The main central image of the monument holds a bolo, a machete, in the right hand and a gun in the other hand. At the back of the central figure a flag of Katipunan in an unfurled state is depicted. A remarkable feature of the molded images of the human figures is the classic style with detailing marked by realistic expressions reflecting the revolutionary spirit with an "upright head and body" and with arms spread on the sides. The central obelisk is surrounded by pools of water.

Gallery

See also
Monument to the Heroes of 1896

References 

Monuments and memorials in Metro Manila
Cultural Properties of the Philippines in Metro Manila
National monuments of the Philippines
Buildings and structures in Caloocan
Art Deco architecture in the Philippines
1933 establishments in the Philippines
1933 sculptures
Art Deco sculptures and memorials
Sculptures by Filipino artists